Turi Turini (Aymara turi tower, the reduplication indicates that there is a group of something, -ni a suffix to indicate ownership, "the one with a group of towers", also spelled Torri Torrini) is a mountain in the La Paz Department in the Andes of Bolivia. It is located in the Loayza Province, Malla Municipality, northeast of Mallachuma.

References 

Mountains of La Paz Department (Bolivia)